The Australian Football League celebrates the best mark of the season through the annual Mark of the Year competition. In 2015, this is officially known as the Weet-Bix AFL Mark of the Year. Each round three marks are nominated and fans are able to vote online for their favourite.

Winners by round
Legend

2015 finalists

References

See also
 Mark of the Year
 Goal of the Year
 2015 AFL Goal of the Year
 2015 AFL season

Mark of the Year
Australian rules football-related lists